The 2013 ITM 400 Auckland was a motor race meeting for the Australasian sedan-based V8 Supercars. It was the third event of the 2013 International V8 Supercars Championship. Four races were held during the race meeting.

It was the first running of the event since 2007. The event replaced the Hamilton 400 on the championship calendar and is the sole New Zealand race.

Race results

Race 6

Qualifying

Top Ten Shootout

Race

Race 7

Qualifying

Race

Race 8

Qualifying

Race

Race 9

Qualifying

Race

Championship standings after the round
 After 9 of 36 races.

Drivers' Championship standings

Teams' Championship standings

 Note: Only the top five positions are included for both sets of standings.

References 

ITM
ITM
April 2013 sports events in New Zealand